Singin' with Feelin' is the tenth solo studio album by American country music singer-songwriter Loretta Lynn. It was released on October 9, 1967, by Decca Records.

Critical reception

Billboard published a review in the issue dated October 28, 1967, which said, "Three extremely well-performed tunes are on this album—but one is so far above the rest that it glows. It's solid, traditional in aspect, soulful in delivery—"I'll Sure Come a Long Way Down". Her other two outstanding songs are pop in nature, "Dark Moon" and "Secret Love", though "Dark Moon" is a country-originated effort."

The review published in the October 21, 1967 issue of Cashbox said, "Hordes and hordes of country fans have massed to secure for Loretta Lynn the position of No. 1 female vocalist, a role which she has enjoyed for several years now, and which she shows little signs of relinquishing. One of the reasons for her immense popularity has been the sincerity and feeling which flavor her vocal efforts, and this LP contains a generous sampling of that feeling,with standout tracks in "Dark Moon", "A Place to Hide And Cry", and her recent smash single, "If You’re Not Gone Too Long"."

Commercial performance 
The album peaked at No. 3 on the US Billboard Hot Country Albums chart.

The album's only single, "If You're Not Gone Too Long", was released in April 1967 and peaked at No. 7 on the US Billboard Hot Country Singles chart.

Recording
Recording sessions for the album took place at Bradley's Barn in Mount Juliet, Tennessee, beginning on January 18, 1967. Two additional sessions followed on April 19 and 20, 1967. Two songs on the album were recorded during the sessions for 1967's Don't Come Home a Drinkin' (With Lovin' on Your Mind). "A Place to Hide and Cry" was recorded on July 16, 1966, and "If Loneliness Don't Kill Me" was recorded on October 5.

Track listing

Personnel
Adapted from the Decca recording session records.
Harold Bradley – electric bass guitar
Owen Bradley – producer
Floyd Cramer – piano
Ray Edenton – acoustic guitar
Buddy Harman – drums
Junior Huskey – bass
The Jordanaires – background vocals
Loretta Lynn – lead vocals
Grady Martin – lead electric guitar
Hal Rugg – steel guitar
Joe Zinkan – bass

Charts
Album

Singles

References 

1967 albums
Loretta Lynn albums
Albums produced by Owen Bradley
Decca Records albums